Renata Kuerten (Braço do Norte, 14 September 1988) is a Brazilian model and TV presenter.

Kuerten was raised in Braço do Norte, Santa Catarina. She decided to become a model when she was 10 years old and realized that dream when she was 16 years old.

Renata is the presenter for the programs, Conexão Models and Chega Mais, of RedeTV in Brazil.

Personal life 
Kuerten, a practising Roman Catholic, is in a long-term relationship with lawyer, Beto Senna, with whom she has a daughter. She is a distant cousin to the tennis player, Gustavo Kuerten.

References

External links
 

Brazilian female models
1988 births
Brazilian television presenters
Living people
People from Santa Catarina (state)
20th-century Brazilian women
21st-century Brazilian women
Brazilian Roman Catholics
Brazilian women television presenters
Brazilian people of German descent